Jalen Crisler (born August 29, 1994) is an American professional soccer player who plays as a defender for USL League One club One Knoxville.

Career

Youth and college
Crisler played college soccer for the Gonzaga Bulldogs. After redshirting his freshman year, Crisler made 64 appearances for the Bulldogs and was First Team All-West Coast Conference in 2016.

During the summers before his junior and senior seasons, Crisler played in the Premier Development League with Seattle Sounders FC U-23.

Professional
Crisler signed with Detroit City FC for their 2019 NPSL Members Cup season after a trial with Indy Eleven. Crisler made 10 appearances for Detroit City, scoring one goal.

Crisler signed with USL League One club Forward Madison FC before the 2020 season.

On February 18, 2021, Crisler made the move to USL League One side Richmond Kickers. Following a stellar 2022 season, Crisler was nominated for USL League One Defender of the Year.

On December 16, 2022, Crisler signed with One Knoxville SC ahead of the 2023 season.

Honors

Individual
USL League One All-League First Team: 2022
USL League One Defender of the Year Nominee: 2022

References

External links
 
 Jalen Crisler at USL League Two
 Jalen Crisler at Gonzaga University Athletics

1994 births
Living people
American soccer players
Association football defenders
Gonzaga Bulldogs men's soccer players
Seattle Sounders FC U-23 players
Detroit City FC players
Forward Madison FC players
Richmond Kickers players
Soccer players from Florida
Sportspeople from Everett, Washington
USL League One players
USL League Two players
National Premier Soccer League players
One Knoxville SC players